The Directorate-General for Human Resources and Security (DG HR) is a Directorate-General of the European Commission.

The essential mission of the Directorate-General is to ensure the European Commission runs smoothly by laying down its policies on human resources and security.

Human Resources
Career development; 
Rights and obligations; 
Health and welfare in the workplace; 
Equal opportunities and non discrimination
Learning and development

Security
Preventing or responding to emergencies
Raising awareness
Investigating
Data security and secure communications

See also
European Commissioner for Budget and Administration
Trans European Services for Telematics between Administrations (TESTA)
European Network and Information Security Agency

External links
Directorate-General for Human Resources and Security

Human Resources and Security